Dead Last is an American fantasy comedy-drama television series, produced by Warner Bros., and aired on The WB from August 14 to September 25, 2001. It starred Sara Downing as Jane Cahill, Tyler Labine as Scotty Sallback, and  Kett Turton as Vaughn Parrish. The series ran for one season with 13 episodes produced, but only 6 episodes were aired by The WB before the series was cancelled.

Plot
The premise of the series was that the three members of the fictional band named The Problem find, and are unable to rid themselves of, a magical amulet that allows them to see and communicate with ghosts. Each episode featured the trio reluctantly completing the unfinished business of the ghosts that they encounter in order to allow the ghosts move on to the next world. Much of the humor of the series came from The Problem wanting to develop their career instead of helping ghosts, and that the trio almost invariably are viewed as, at best, mentally unbalanced by those who cannot see or hear ghosts.

Episodes

Broadcast
All 13 episodes were aired in Canada on YTV with its first run between September 15 and December 8, 2001. The entire series was often shown on the Trouble channel in the UK.

References

External links

2000s American comedy-drama television series
2001 American television series debuts
2001 American television series endings
Television series by Warner Bros. Television Studios
English-language television shows
American fantasy television series
The WB original programming
American fantasy drama television series
Television series about fictional musicians